Land-use framework regions are a scheme of organizing local governments adopted by the Canadian province of Alberta. Numbering seven in total, each land-use region is named for, and roughly follows the boundary of, a major watershed. Managed by Alberta Environment and Parks, the stated aims of the program are to create a venue for regionwide planning and cooperation, promoting sustainable use of public and private lands. Every region is intended to develop and enact its own comprehensive regional land-use plan, guiding future development within its territory. However, as of 2019, approved plans have only been submitted from two of the seven regions.

History 

Land-use planning has been practiced in various forms by the Alberta government for more than a century. In 1948, the Manning government divided the province into a 'green' and 'white' area. The 'Green Area', comprising 61% of Alberta's landmass and mostly owned by the provincial government, was to be managed for forest production, wildlife management, and recreation. The 'White Area', comprising the remaining 39%, was designated for settlement and agriculture. Further plans, some regional in scope, were implemented over the next few decades. For instance, the 1977 Policy for Resource Management of the Eastern Slopes identified watershed protection and public recreation as higher priorities than non-renewable resource development in Alberta's Rocky Mountain Foothills. However, these were implemented on a case-by-case basis, and never achieved comprehensive coverage of the province's landmass.

By the late 2000s, eight disparate provincial government departments each maintained an individual interest in land use. As facilitating effective Indigenous consultation became another concern of the era, the 2007 Land-use Framework was intended to provide the first-ever formal venue for cooperation between the provincial bureaucracy, its numerous local governments, and all other interested parties.

List

See also 
 Calgary Metropolitan Region
 Edmonton Metropolitan Region

References

 
Regionalism (politics)